Jatupong Thongsukh (born January 12, 1976, is a Thai retired footballer. He scored two goals for the national team. Currently, he is a teacher at Chulalongkorn University Demonstration Secondary School, also coaching the school football team. He is currently the manager of STK Muangnont.

International goals

References

External links

1976 births
Living people
Jatupong Thongsukh
Jatupong Thongsukh
Jatupong Thongsukh
Jatupong Thongsukh
Jatupong Thongsukh
Jatupong Thongsukh
Association football forwards
Jatupong Thongsukh
Southeast Asian Games medalists in football
Competitors at the 1999 Southeast Asian Games